Boubacar Cissokho (born 6 December 1994) is a Senegalese footballer who currently plays as a defender.

International career
Cissokho was part of the Senegalese U-23 selection that participated in the 2015 U-23 Africa Cup of Nations in Senegal. He played his first international game with the senior national team on 17 October 2015 in and against Guinea (2–0), where he was part of the starting squad and played the entire match.

References

External links
 

1994 births
Living people
Senegalese footballers
Senegalese expatriate footballers
Senegal international footballers
Association football defenders
Al-Thoqbah Club players
Saudi First Division League players
Senegalese expatriate sportspeople in Saudi Arabia
Expatriate footballers in Saudi Arabia